Elections to the Legislative Assembly of the Indian state of Saurashtra  were held on March 26, 1952. 222 candidates contested for the 55 constituencies in the Assembly. There were 5 two-member constituencies and 50 single-member constituencies.

Results

!colspan=8|
|- style="background-color:#E9E9E9; text-align:center;"
! class="unsortable" |
! Political party !! Flag !! Seats  Contested !! Won !! % of  Seats !! Votes !! Vote %
|- style="background: #90EE90;"
| 
| style="text-align:left;" |Indian National Congress
| 
| 59 || 55 || 91.67 || 606,934 || 63.79
|-
|
| style="text-align:left;" |Saurashtra Khedut Sangh
|
| 37 || 1 || 1.67 || 139,449 || 14.66
|-
| 
| style="text-align:left;" |Akhil Bharatiya Hindu Mahasabha
|
| 25 || 0 || || 43,043 || 4.52
|-
| 
| style="text-align:left;" |Socialist Party
|
| 28 || 2 || 3.33 || 34,778 || 3.66
|-
| 
| style="text-align:left;" |Kisan Mazdoor Praja Party
|
| 16 || 0 || || 30,907 || 3.25
|-
| 
| style="text-align:left;" |Communist Party of India
| 
| 3 || 0 || || 7,791 || 0.82
|-
| 
| style="text-align:left;" |Scheduled Castes Federation
|
| 3 || 0 || || 4,977 || 0.52
|-
| 
| style="text-align:left;" |Bharatiya Jana Sangh
|
| 3 || 0 || || 4,346 || 0.46
|-
| 
| style="text-align:left;" |Akhil Bharatiya Ram Rajya Parishad
|
| 1 || 0 || || 3,660 || 0.38
|-
| 
|
| 50 || 2 || 3.33 || 75,624 || 7.95
|- class="unsortable" style="background-color:#E9E9E9"
! colspan = 3| Total seats
! 60 !! style="text-align:center;" |Voters !! 20,81,140 !! style="text-align:center;" |Turnout !! 9,51,509 (45.72%)
|}

Winning candidates

State reorganization and merger
On 1 November 1956, Saurashtra State was merged into Bombay State under States Reorganisation Act, 1956.

See also

 Saurashtra State
 1951–52 elections in India
 Bombay State
 1957 Bombay Legislative Assembly election

References

Saurashtra
State Assembly elections in Maharashtra
State Assembly elections in Gujarat
March 1952 events in Asia
Saurashtra Legislative Assembly